Optimer Pharmaceuticals Inc was a biopharmaceutical company, originally headquartered in San Diego, California, and later moved to Jersey City, New Jersey, United States.

The company focused on developing specialty drugs to treat gastrointestinal infections and related diseases. In 2011, it received regulatory approval for the first antibacterial drug, Dificid, in 25 years approved to treat certain types of diarrhea (i.e., Clostridium difficile induced diarrhea) in adults. But sales of the drug Dificid failed to meet expectations and the drug faced strong competition from cheaper generic alternatives.

History
Optimer Pharmaceuticals, Inc. was founded in 1998 and registered in the state of Delaware. Corporate and R&D headquarters were located in San Diego, California until 2011.  CEO Michael Nientse Chang founded, funded and built the company with his wife, Tessie Mary Che, who was COO from 1998 to 2011.

From 2007 to 2013, Optimer Pharmaceuticals was traded on Nasdaq Stock Exchange under OPTR. At one time, its share price was USD 8.50 per share.

In July 2013, Cubist Pharmaceuticals agreed to purchase Trius Therapeutics and Optimer Pharmaceuticals for around $1.6 billion.

In late October 2013, Cubist Pharmaceuticals completed its $535 million acquisition of Jersey City-based Optimer Pharmaceuticals. Optimer employees were told the New Jersey office would close down in 2014. This company no longer exists.

References

Biotechnology companies of the United States
Pharmaceutical companies established in 1998
Pharmaceutical companies disestablished in 2013
1998 establishments in New Jersey
Companies based in Jersey City, New Jersey